Tamper may refer to:

Tamper, to use a tamp, a tool for material compaction
Tamper, a pipe tool component
Tamper (nuclear weapons), a layer of dense material surrounding the fissile material
Tamper, to interfere with, falsify, or sabotage
Ballast tamper, a machine that tamps railroad track ballast

See also
Tampere
Tampering (disambiguation)